Sugandha Santosh Mishra (born 23 May 1988) is an Indian actress, playback singer, television presenter, comedian and radio jockey in the Indian film and television industry. She is known for her character in The Kapil Sharma Show. She was also noticed for her appearance in the TV reality show The Great Indian Laughter Challenge.

Personal life 
Sugandha Mishra was born on 23 May 1988, in Jalandhar, Punjab. Her parents are Santosh Mishra and Savita Mishra. She enrolled at Guru Nanak Dev University, Amritsar, Punjab and Apeejay College of Fine Arts, Jalandhar from where she completed her Master's in Music. Since childhood, she was inclined towards music as her family belongs to Indore Gharana. She is the fourth generation of her family into singing, she was classically trained by her grandfather Pt. Shankar Lal Mishra who was a disciple of Ustaad Amir Khan Sahib. 

She married fellow comedian and co-star Sanket Bhosale on 26 April 2021.

Career 
Sugandha started her career as a radio jockey and worked with BIG FM India. After that, she started her singing career and sang many jingles, bhajans, and songs in many documentaries, plays, and short films. She also made her appearance in the famous TV reality show Sa Re Ga Ma Pa Singing Superstar as a participant and became third-runner up in the show. After that, she appeared in the TV comedy show The Great Indian Laughter Challenge as a participant and became one of the finalists in the show.

Apart from that she also gave her voice in Bollywood songs in the movies like Shree and Kamaal Dhamaal Malamaal. She also hosted many shows.

She made her acting debut on the big screen with the movie Heropanti in 2014 in a supporting role. She appeared on many TV shows like Dance Plus, IPL Extra Inning, Baal Veer, The Kapil Sharma Show, The Drama Company.
She has performed in 133rd Harivallabh Sammelan in 2008, in which she Gave a splendid performance with her Khayal Singing, Thumri Tappa and Bhajan.

Filmography

Television shows

Discography

References

.The Kapil Sharma Show

External links
 

Indian women playback singers
Indian women television presenters
Indian television presenters
Living people
People from Jalandhar
1988 births
Bollywood playback singers
21st-century Indian singers
21st-century Indian women singers
Women musicians from Punjab, India
Singers from Punjab, India